Ofeq-7 (also known as Ofek 7 or Offek-7) is part of the Ofeq family of Earth observation satellites designed and built by Israel Aerospace Industries (IAI) for the Israel Ministry of Defense.

Launch 
The Ofeq-7 was launched by a Shavit 2 space launch vehicle on 10 June 2007 at 23:40 UTC.

Mission 
Three days after its launch, on 13 June 2007, IAI MBT Space Division received the first images taken by the satellite. The Ofeq-7 is a follow-on spacecraft to Ofeq-5 that was placed into orbit in 2002.

References 

Reconnaissance satellites of Israel
Spacecraft launched in 2007
Spacecraft launched by Shavit rockets
2007 in Israel
IAI satellites